140 William Street (formerly BHP House) is a 41-storey steel, concrete and glass building located in the eastern side of the central business district of Melbourne, Victoria, Australia. Constructed between 1969 and 1972, BHP House was designed by the architectural practice Yuncken Freeman alongside engineers Irwinconsult, with heavy influence of contemporary skyscrapers in Chicago, Illinois. The local architects sought technical advice from Bangladeshi-American structural engineer Fazlur Rahman Khan, of renowned American architectural firm Skidmore, Owings & Merrill, spending ten weeks at its Chicago office in 1968. At the time, BHP House was known to be the tallest steel-framed building and the first office building in Australia to use a “total energy concept” – the generation of its own electricity using BHP natural gas. The name BHP House came from the building being the national headquarters of BHP. BHP House has been included in the Victorian Heritage Register (Number H1699) for significance to the State of Victoria for following three reasons:

 Architectural – 140 William Street is one of the most noteworthy building designs by the Melbourne firm Yuncken Freeman.
 Technological – Its innovative structural application of steel and concrete, leading to open floor plates that are now a standard feature of high rise office buildings.
 Historical – The building signifies changes in Melbourne's CBD as it transformed into a major corporate centre.

Key influences and design approach
Containing 41 floors and standing at 152m tall, BHP House was designed in a ‘Modern Style’ during the 1960s. The design was promoting the use of steel in Australian construction and sought to establish new national height standards for a steel-framed structure. Consisting of three dominant materials - steel, concrete and glass - BHP House was the tallest building in the city upon completion. The building's expressed gridded structure was a clear break from the sheer curtain walls of the 1950s and 1960s, and like the pioneering skyscrapers of Mies van der Rohe, it was designed as a three dimensional sculptural monument, detached from the surrounding cityscape. In the architectural field, BHP House is regarded as one of the most notable projects by Yuncken Freeman Architects due to cutting edge techniques for an office building such as flush glazing, minimalist interiors and expressed structural bracing.

Yuncken Freeman carried out a series of experiments for the design proposals of BHP House in the construction processes of their own offices in 1970, located at 411-415 King Street, Melbourne. Under the advice of Fazlur Khan, a structural engineer from Skidmore, Owings & Merrill, the design revolves around four basic components in order to reinvent the tower as a ‘cantilever’ and achieve the properties of a ‘giant stiff structural tube’. The four components consist of a steel-framed flooring system, a steel-framed central core, a steel and glass façade, and steel trusses that connect the central core to the façade. Innovative techniques were employed to lay the foundations of the building – a concrete raft which was poured in a single continuous action. The weight of the floor structure was reduced by using open-web steel beams and a lightweight layer of concrete. Along with cap and belt trusses, this flooring system performed a stiffening effect and allowed structural loads to be transferred down through the central steel-framed core and the outer steel-framed façade, eradicating the need for internal columns and providing flexibility for internal spaces. The design of the building was also notable for the ‘total energy system’ which allowed electrical generation using BHP natural gas. BHP House set the standard for many subsequent office buildings and led to the change of Melbourne Town Planning Codes which were altered to cater for increased building heights and floor areas. When completed, it was the second tallest building in Australia behind Australia Square.

Awards
 RIVA Victorian Architects award - 1975

References

External links

urban.melbourne
vhd.heritagecouncil.vic.gov.au
www.architecture.com.au 
www.walkingmelbourne.com.au

BHP
Buildings and structures in Melbourne City Centre
Office buildings in Melbourne
Skyscrapers in Melbourne
William Street, 140
Office buildings completed in 1972
Architecture of Melbourne
Bangladeshi inventions
Skyscraper office buildings in Australia
1972 establishments in Australia
Fazlur Khan buildings